Craig Serani Marsh (born 7 June 1982), known professionally as Serani, is a Jamaican dancehall singer and producer who has a joint venture deal with Phase One Communications in NYC. He is best known for his involvement in Sean Paul's album The Trinity and his 2008 single "No Games".

Early life
Serani was born 7 June 1982 in Kingston, Jamaica. He decided at a young age that his two other best friends who also shared the same interest in music should put together DASECA productions in 2001. Three friends David Anthony Harrisingh, Craig Serani Marsh, and Craig Andrew Harrisingh had a goal to produce all the major Reggae artists in Jamaica.

Career

2006–2008: Early career/Production credits
In 2006, Serani co-produced the first two singles on Sean Paul's platinum album The Trinity, including "We Be Burnin'", which was the first released single. "We Be Burnin’" track helped Trinity break a Jamaican record of 107,000 copies sold in the first week. Serani also produced the album Smash riddim, which hosts the song "Dutty Wine" by Tony Matterhorn. Dutty Wine was the number one song in Jamaica and England for a lengthy period of time. Serani is credited for helping bring into the limelight other Jamaican heavyweights such as Mavado, Alaine Laughton and Bugle with his catchy beats such as the Anger Management riddim on which Mavado voiced his landmark hit "Real McCoy". DASECA productions has also produced hits for other Reggae icons such as their colleague and Alliance crew leader Bounty Killer, Busy Signal and Vybz Kartel amongst many others. They are also the backbone of The Alliance affiliated band Anger Management. His first and very successful attempt at singing was on Mavado's hit song Dying which is featured on the latter's début album Gangsta for Life: The Symphony of David Brooks. He sang the hook and Mavado chanted the verses.

2008–present: Rise to fame and No Games
In 2008, Serani landed a contract to record two albums for JVC Entertainment, before going on to sign the deal with Phase One. Serani self-produces most of his own songs and has promoted singles such as "Doh" featuring Bugle, "No Games" and "She Loves Me". In 2012, he performed at the Ride Club in Vienna.

In 2020, "No Games" was sampled by Eminem for "Farewell" which appeared on the rapper's album Music to Be Murdered By.

Discography

Albums

Singles
2008: "No Games", BPI: Platinum
2008: "She Loves Me"
2008: "Doh"
2008: "Mama Still Hungry"
2008: "Stinkin' Rich"
2008: "Study People"
2009: "Is This Real"
2009: "Romance"
2009: "Naked"
2009: "When It's Cold"
2010: "She Loves Me" (Remix featuring Fuego)
2010: "Que Buena Tu Ta" (Remix featuring Fuego)
2010: "Skip to My Luu" (featuring Ding Dong)
2010: "Searching"
2011: "Dear Lord"

References

External links
 Dance Hall Areaz
 RRR Music
 Serani Shoots Video
 Madaroad

Jamaican reggae musicians
Reggae fusion artists
Musicians from Kingston, Jamaica
Living people
1982 births